Ntholeng Lechesa (born 29 March 1997) is a Lesotho male squash player. He made his first Commonwealth Games appearance during the 2014 Commonwealth Games representing Lesotho at the age of 17 and competed in the men's singles and men's doubles categories.

References 

1997 births
Living people
Lesotho male squash players
Squash players at the 2014 Commonwealth Games
Commonwealth Games competitors for Lesotho